The Royal Palace of Yogyakarta is a palace complex in the city of Yogyakarta, Yogyakarta Special Region, Indonesia. It is the seat of the reigning Sultan of Yogyakarta and his family. The complex is a center of Javanese culture, and contains a museum displaying royal artifacts. It is guarded by the Yogyakarta Kraton Guards (Indonesian: Prajurit Keraton Ngayogyakarta Hadiningrat).

History
The complex was built in 1755–1756 (AJ 1682) for Hamengkubuwono I, the first Sultan of Yogyakarta. It was one of the monarch's first acts after the signing of the Treaty of Giyanti, which recognized the creation of the Sultanate of Yogyakarta under the Dutch East India Company. A banyan forest, protected from flooding by its location between two rivers, was chosen as the site for the palace.

On 20 June 1812, Sir Stamford Raffles led a 1,200-strong British and Irish force to attack the walled royal city of Yogyakarta. Although they outnumbered the British, the Javanese were unprepared for the attack. Yogyakarta fell in one day, and the palace was sacked and burnt. The attack was the first of its kind on a Javanese court, and the Sultanate briefly became subject to British authority before the British government returned control of Indonesia to the Dutch. Most of the current palace was built by Sultan Hamengkubuwono VIII (who reigned from 1921 to 1939), and was rebuilt after earthquakes in 1876 and 2006.

Architecture
The palace's chief architect was Sultan Hamengkubuwono I, who founded the Yogyakarta Sultanate. His architectural expertise was appreciated by the Dutch scientist Theodoor Gautier Thomas Pigeaud and Lucien Adam, who considered him a worthy successor of Pakubuwono II (founder of the Surakarta Sunanate). The palace layout, which followed the basic design of the old city of Yogyakarta, was completed in 1755–1756; another building was added by a later Sultan of Yogyakarta.

The complex consists of a courtyard covered with sand from the south coast, a main building and a secondary building. The buildings are separated by a wall with a regol in semar tinandu style. The palace door is made of thick teak. Behind (or in front of) a gate in Javanese architecture is usually an insulating wall (Renteng or Baturono), sometimes with a distinctive, traditional ornament.

The wooden buildings of the complex have a traditional Javanese architectural style, decorated with flora, fauna, or nature motifs. Foreign influences (Portuguese, Dutch, and Chinese) are also seen. The buildings are of joglo construction.

The trapezoidal joglo roof is usually covered with red or gray shingles, tiles, or zinc. It is supported by a central pillar (soko guru) and secondary pillars. Pillars are usually dark green or black, with yellow, light-green, red or gold highlights. Other wooden building elements match the pillars in color.

For the stone pedestal (Ompak), the black color is combined with gold ornamentation. White dominates the walls of the building and the complex. The floor, usually made of white marble or patterned tiles, is higher than the sandy courtyard. Some buildings have a higher main floor. Other buildings have a square stone (Selo Gilang) for the sultan's throne.

Each building is classified by use. The main-class building (used by the sultan) has more ornamentation than the lower-class buildings, which have simple ornamentation or none at all.

Symbolism

A kraton is a palace. Keraton is the living quarters of the royal family. Tamarind and Spanish cherry trees line the road from Krapyak Hunting House to the palace, which runs from Tugu Yogyakarta to the palace.

Tugu Yogyakarta (the Gilig golong monument), on the north side of the old city, symbolizes "unification between the king (golong) and the people (gilig)" (Javanese: manunggaling kawulo gusti). It also symbolizes the final unity of the creator (Khalik) and his subjects. The Gate Donopratoro (gate to the Kedaton quarter) represents "a good person is someone who is generous and knows how to control his lust", and the two Dwarapala statues (Balabuta and Cinkarabala) represent good and evil. The palace's artifacts are believed to have the power to repulse evil.

Performances
The palace hosts gamelan (music), Javanese dance, macapat (poetry), and wayang (shadow puppetry) performances.

In popular culture
The Kraton Ngayogyakarta Hadiningrat was the second Pit Stop in The Amazing Race 19.

Gallery

See also

 List of monarchs of Java
 Fort Vredeburg
 Gedung Agung
 Taman Sari (Yogyakarta)
 List of palaces in Indonesia

References

Further reading

External links

Kraton Yogyakarta Hadinigrat at Yogyakarta government official website 
KratonJogja.com, created by Gadjah Mada University
Kraton Yogya

Buildings and structures in Yogyakarta
Cultural Properties of Indonesia in Yogyakarta
Tourist attractions in Yogyakarta
World Heritage Sites in Indonesia
Yogyakarta Palace